Nick Bruno and Troy Quane are an American film directing team best known for their work with Blue Sky Studios, including Spies in Disguise (2019) and Nimona (2023).

Career 
Quane began his career at Walt Disney Studios as a storyboard artist on the films The Wild (2006) and Enchanted (2007). He later left the company to serve as a story artist on 9 (2009), Arthur Christmas (2011), and Hotel Transylvania (2012). Bruno began his career at Blue Sky Studios as an animator on four Ice Age films: The Meltdown (2006), Dawn of the Dinosaurs (2009), Continental Drift (2012), and Collision Course (2016). He was also an animator on Rio (2011), Epic (2013), Rio 2 (2014), and The Peanuts Movie (2015). In 2011, Quane began his directorial career with the film The Smurfs: A Christmas Carol. In 2012, Quane was hired to co-direct the film Kazorn & The Unicorn with Kelly Asbury. In 2019, Quane and Bruno first teamed up to direct the animated comedy film Spies in Disguise, for Blue Sky Studios. In April 2022, it was announced that they will direct the upcoming Netflix animated film Nimona.

Filmography 
Troy Quane

Nick Bruno

References

External links 
 
 

American animated film directors
American film directors
Blue Sky Studios people
Living people
Place of birth missing (living people)
Year of birth missing (living people)